The RM-3 is a freeway in Murcia, Spain. It connects the Guadalentín Valley with Mazarrón. It was inaugurated in 2007, and belongs to the Murcian Government.

References 

Autopistas and autovías in Spain
Transport in the Region of Murcia